The Jones County School District is a public school district based in Ellisville, Mississippi (USA).

In addition to Ellisville, the district also serves a small section of Laurel and the towns of Moselle, Ovett, Sandersville, Sharon, Jones County,Gray|Sharon]], Soso, and the Jones County portion of Georgia.

Schools

Middle/high schools (and their principals)
Grades 7–12
Northeast Jones High School – Dr. Jennifer Lowery; Supervising Principal
South Jones High School – Dr. Catherine Ladner; Supervising Principal
West Jones High School – Cooper Pope; Supervising Principal

Elementary schools (and their principals)

Grades K-6
East Jones Elementary School – Sylvia Busby; Supervising Principal
Glade Elementary School – Lisa Ishee; Supervising Principal
North Jones Elementary School – Robert Hill; Supervising Principal
Moselle Elementary School – Juanna Warren; Supervising Principal
West Jones Elementary School – Mark Reddoch; Supervising Principal
South Jones Elementary School – Wade Clark; Supervising Principal

Demographics

2017-18 school year
There were a total of 8,837 students enrolled in the Jones County School District during the 2017–2018 school year. The gender makeup of the district was 49% female and 51% male. The racial makeup of the district was 19.3% African American, 64.8% White, 10.4% Hispanic, 1.0% Native American, and 0.6% Asian. 68.5% of the district's students were eligible to receive free lunch.

Previous school years

Accountability statistics

See also
List of school districts in Mississippi

References

External links
 

Education in Jones County, Mississippi
School districts in Mississippi